The UEFA Champions League, known until 1992 as the European Champion Clubs' Cup or colloquially as the European Cup, is an annual association football cup competition organised by UEFA since 1955. Originally a straight knockout competition open only to champion clubs, the tournament was expanded during the 1990s to incorporate a round-robin group phase and more teams. The expansion resulted in more games being played, increasing players' goalscoring chances; thus the rankings are weighted in favour of modern players: only seven out of the 51 players on the list never competed in the reformed Champions League.

With 140 goals, Cristiano Ronaldo is currently the all-time top goalscorer, while his career rival Lionel Messi is the only other player to surpass 100 goals. Ronaldo and Messi have also won the Golden Boot on the most occasions in the competition's history, with seven and six respectively.

All-time top scorers 
A  indicates the player was from the European Cup era. 
Players that are taking part in the 2022–23 UEFA Champions League are highlighted in boldface.
The table below does not include goals scored in the qualification stage of the competition.

Top scorers by season
The table below does not include goals scored in the qualification stage of the competition.

By player

By country

Notes

See also 
 List of footballers with 100 or more UEFA Champions League appearances
 List of UEFA Champions League hat-tricks
 List of UEFA Cup and Europa League top scorers
 List of UEFA Cup Winners' Cup top scorers

References

Top scorers
UEFA Champions
UEFA Champions
Career achievements of association football players